Eric López Royo (born 1 April 1993) is a Spanish footballer who plays for Vilassar de Mar as a central midfielder. He also played for Sant Andreu and Europa

Football career
Born in Barcelona, Catalonia, López was a product of local RCD Espanyol's youth ranks. He made his competitive debut with the first team on 6 March 2011, playing the last eight minutes of the 0–1 away loss against Levante UD; he added another appearance in La Liga, again being featured as a late substitute in a 0–2 defeat at Málaga CF two weeks later.

López served consecutive loans until his release in 2014. During this timeframe and subsequently, he never competed in higher than Segunda División B.

References

External links

1993 births
Living people
Spanish footballers
Footballers from Barcelona
Association football midfielders
La Liga players
Segunda División B players
Tercera División players
RCD Espanyol B footballers
RCD Espanyol footballers
Villarreal CF C players
Villarreal CF B players
FC Cartagena footballers
AE Prat players
Cultural Leonesa footballers
UE Vilassar de Mar players
CE Europa footballers